The 2010 My AOD Favourites Awards, presented by Astro in Malaysia, was an awards ceremony that recognised the best Hong Kong television programmes that had aired on Malaysia's Astro On Demand (AOD) in 2010. It replaced the Astro Wah Lai Toi Drama Awards, which recognised TVB dramas that aired on the Malaysian subscription channel, Astro Wah Lai Toi. 

The ceremony took place on 3 December 2010 at the Shangri-La Hotel in Hong Kong.

Winners and nominees

References

TVB original programming
2010 television awards
2010 in Malaysian television
2010 in Hong Kong television

zh:MY AOD我的最爱颁奖典礼2010